Mbanino Igor Samuel de Nascimento (born 19 November 1983) is an Angolan retired footballer.

Career

Turkey
Putting pen to paper on a 4.5-year agreement with Malatyaspor at the start of 2005, Nascimento separated with Doğunun Kaplanları later that year.

Finland
Attending sessions with Haka from the 1st to the 7th of August 2005, the Angolan put pen to paper until the close of 2005 with them, opening his goal account away in IFK Marieham, finishing with three goals in 9 games.

References

External links 
 at ZeroZero 
 Girabola Profile

1983 births
Living people
Angolan footballers
Association football forwards
Angolan expatriate footballers
Veikkausliiga players
F.C. Bravos do Maquis players
C.R. Caála players
Malatyaspor footballers
FC Haka players
Expatriate footballers in Turkey
Expatriate footballers in Finland
Girabola players